

This is a list of the National Register of Historic Places listings in Tazewell County, Illinois.

This is intended to be a complete list of the properties and districts on the National Register of Historic Places in Tazewell County, Illinois, United States. Latitude and longitude coordinates are provided for many National Register properties and districts; these locations may be seen together in a map.

There are 17 properties and districts listed on the National Register in the county.

Current listings

|}

Former listing

|}

References

See also

List of National Historic Landmarks in Illinois
National Register of Historic Places listings in Illinois

Tazewell County, Illinois